Scheckter is a surname. Notable people with the surname include:

Jody Scheckter (born 1950), South African business proprietor and motor racing driver
Toby Scheckter (born 1978), South African racing driver
Tomas Scheckter (born 1980), South African racing driver, son of Jody

See also
Schecter (disambiguation)